Forza Futbol Club is a Filipino association football club based in Alabang, Muntinlupa. The club played in the former United Football League, which was the highest level of club football in the Philippines, and made its professional debut appearance in the 2011 UFL Cup.

Club Staff

References

External links

Association football clubs established in 2002
Football clubs in the Philippines
Sports teams in Metro Manila